Hansreisseria is a genus of snout moths. It was described by Roesler in 1973. It contains only one species Hansreisseria gilvescens, which is found on the Canary Islands.

References

External links
lepiforum.eu

Phycitini
Monotypic moth genera
Moths described in 1917
Moths of Africa
Pyralidae genera